Arnold John "Jigger" Statz (October 20, 1897 – March 16, 1988) was an American professional baseball player, manager and scout. An outfielder, Statz appeared in 683 games played in Major League Baseball, but had a lengthy and notable minor league career, playing in almost 2,800 games. He is one of only nine players known to have amassed at least 4,000 combined hits in the major and minor leagues.

Early life
Statz attended Holy Cross College in Worcester, Massachusetts, where he moved from Illinois along with his parents at an early age. He played baseball for two years at Holy Cross before enlisting in the U. S. Navy during World War I. Though he signed with the Giants in 1919, Statz continued his studies at Holy Cross and graduated with his class in 1921.

Major league career
Statz played in the major leagues during eight seasons from 1919 to 1928 for the Chicago Cubs, New York Giants, Boston Red Sox, and Brooklyn Robins. His best season was in 1923 with the Cubs, when he played in all 154 games, compiling a .319 batting average, with 10 home runs and 70 runs batted in.

Minor league career
Statz played 18 minor league seasons, all of them for the Los Angeles Angels of the top-level Pacific Coast League. In an era when many players had lengthy minor league careers, Statz's statistics surpassed those of his contemporaries, e.g. a grand total of 4,093 major and minor league hits, and a total number of games played which was exceeded only by Pete Rose.

Statz had a distinguished career in the Pacific Coast League. He holds the PCL records for games played (2,790), hits (3,356), doubles (597), triples (136), and runs scored (1,996). His career PCL batting average was .315. The year after his playing career ended, he was a member of the first group of players elected to the Pacific Coast League Hall of Fame.

Total hits

Statz is one of only nine players (along with Pete Rose, Ty Cobb, Ichiro Suzuki, Hank Aaron, Minnie Miñoso, Julio Franco, Derek Jeter, and Stan Musial) known to have amassed at least 4,000 combined hits in the major leagues and minor leagues. (Jake Beckley and Sam Crawford may also have hit 4,000, but data for some of their minor league seasons are missing.)

Post–playing career
Statz managed for five years in the minor leagues. He was the Angels' player-manager during 1940–1942, and managed the Visalia Cubs of the California League in 1948–1949.

Jigger Statz played himself in the 1929 Paramount film, Fast Company, and in 1952 served as a technical advisor for The Winning Team, a fictionalized Warner Bros. biography of Grover Cleveland Alexander which starred Ronald Reagan.

References

External links

1897 births
1988 deaths
Baseball players from Illinois
Boston Red Sox players
Brooklyn Robins players
Chicago Cubs players
Chicago Cubs scouts
Los Angeles Angels (minor league) managers
Los Angeles Angels (minor league) players
Major League Baseball outfielders
New York Giants (NL) players
Pacific Coast League MVP award winners
Sportspeople from Waukegan, Illinois